Oleksandr Arpadovych Nad (born 2 September 1985) is a Ukrainian footballer who plays for NB II club Nyíregyháza.

External links
 
 

1985 births
Living people
Ukrainian footballers
FC Hoverla Uzhhorod players
FC Bihor Oradea players
Budapest Honvéd FC players
Gyirmót FC Győr players
Debreceni VSC players
Nyíregyháza Spartacus FC players
Nemzeti Bajnokság I players
Association football goalkeepers
Ukrainian Premier League players
Ukrainian First League players
Ukrainian people of Hungarian descent
Ukrainian expatriate footballers
Expatriate footballers in Romania
Ukrainian expatriate sportspeople in Romania
Expatriate footballers in Hungary
Ukrainian expatriate sportspeople in Hungary
Sportspeople from Uzhhorod